is a Japanese actress and model. She has been affiliated with the talent agency Dolce Star (ドルチェスター) since 2016. She graduated from Chiba Prefectural Yachiyo High School (千葉県立八千代高校), and now studies economics at Komazawa University (駒澤大学).

Biography 
Rin Emasu was born and raised in Chiba Prefecture, Japan. In high school period she participated a National Drama Championships and won Awards For Excellence.

Filmography

Television dramas

Movie

Stage dramas

Advertisement・CM・MV

Event

References

External links 
 Official website
 MV『あなたの歌は最後にするね』
 楽天スーパーライブTV『「ネコの日」特集 Part 1 大人気にゃんこ「ふーちゃん」中継』
 映画「この宇宙のどこかで」

1995 births
Living people
Actresses from Tokyo